Tajori is a town and union council of Lakki Marwat District in Khyber Pakhtunkhwa province of Pakistan. It is located at 32°37'34N 70°34'55E and has an altitude of 319 metres (1049 feet).

References

Union councils of Lakki Marwat District
Populated places in Lakki Marwat District